Lepotrema amblyglyphidodonis is a species of lepocreadiid digenean parasitic in the intestine of marine fish. It was described in 2018.

Hosts and localities

The staghorn damselfish, Amblyglyphidodon curacao, (Perciformes: Pomacentridae), is the type-host of Lepotrema amblyglyphidodonis. Another host is the Barrier Reef anemonefish, Amphipron akyndynos  (Pomacentridae). The type-locality is off Heron Island, Great Barrier Reef, Australia.

References 

Plagiorchiida
Animals described in 2018
Platyhelminthes of Australia
Parasites of fish